George Lydon (born 24 June 1902 – 12 August 1953) was an English footballer who played as a full-back. Born in Newton Heath, Manchester, he played for Nelson United, Mossley Manchester United, and Southport.

External links
MUFCInfo.com profile

1902 births
1953 deaths
English footballers
Mossley A.F.C. players
Manchester United F.C. players
Southport F.C. players
People from Newton Heath
Association football defenders